Zawonia may refer to the following places in Poland:
Zawonia, Lower Silesian Voivodeship (south-west Poland)
Zawonia, Masovian Voivodeship (east-central Poland)